Rufus "Tee Tot" Payne (February 4, 1883 – March 17, 1939) was an early-20th-century African-American blues musician from Greenville, Alabama, who was more widely known by his nickname Tee Tot.

Payne's nickname of "Tee Tot" is an ironic pun for "teetotaler". It is said that Payne received his nickname because he usually carried a homemade mixture of alcohol and tea wherever he went.

Early life
According to Alabama historian Alice Harp, Payne was born in 1883 on the Payne Plantation in Sandy Ridge, Lowndes County, Alabama.

Career and influence

Some say Tee Tot played the blues alone; others state that he led a little combo that played pop songs and hokum numbers and was a street musician.

Tee Tot is best known for being a mentor to Hank Williams. Rufus Payne met Hank Williams when Hank was eight years old, and legend has it that he would come around and play Hank's guitar, showing Hank how to improvise chords. His influence in exposing Williams to blues and other African American influences helped Williams successfully fuse hillbilly, folk and blues into his own unique style, which in turn expanded and exposed both white and black audiences to the differing sounds.

Death
Payne died at a charity hospital in Montgomery, Alabama, on March 17, 1939, at the age of 56. He is buried at Lincoln Cemetery in Montgomery; as the exact location of his gravesite is unknown, a memorial to him stands near the entrance to the cemetery, paid for by Hank Williams Jr. and other members of the Grand Ole Opry.

Tributes
Hank Williams, Jr. paid tribute to Tee Tot's influence on his father through "The Tee Tot Song" on his Almeria Club album.

He was portrayed by actor Rex Ingram in the 1964 Hank Williams biopic Your Cheatin' Heart.

References

American blues singers
American blues guitarists
American male guitarists
African-American guitarists
American street performers
Musicians from Montgomery, Alabama
Blues musicians from Alabama
Guitarists from Alabama
People from Greenville, Alabama
20th-century American guitarists
1883 births
1939 deaths
20th-century African-American male singers